Kinga Anna Preis (born 31 August 1971, in Wrocław) is a Polish film and theatre actress.

Life and career
She graduated from Ludwik Solski Academy for the Dramatic Arts in 1996. In 2006, she received the Zbigniew Cybulski Award for best young actress. In 2010 Preis was decorated with Golden Cross of Merit. In 2011, she was awarded the Silver Medal for Merit to Culture – Gloria Artis. For her roles she won 5 Polish Film Awards and was nominated 10 times.

Filmography (original titles) 
 1996: Opowieści weekendowe: Niepisane prawa as Jolanta
 1997: Pokój 107 as Zośka (TV)
 1997: Farba as Majka
 1998: Poniedziałek as Renata
 1998: Dom Pirków as Pirks' mother
 1999: Wrota Europy as Hala
 2000-2001: Przeprowadzki as Róża Szczygieł (TV)
 2000: Twarze i maski as Agnieszka Horn (TV)
 2000: To ja, złodziej as Pyza's mother, prostitute
 2001: Wtorek as Renata
 2001: Cisza as Mimi
 2003: Symmetry as Dawid's wife
 2004: Nigdy w życiu! as Kinga
 2004: Kryminalni as Teresa Nowacka (TV, episode 12)
 2005: Defekt as Malcowa, Szymek's wife (TV)
 2005: Przybyli ułani as Jadźka, Marian's wife
 2005: Karol - Un uomo diventato Papa as Józef's mother
 2005: Komornik as Gosia
 2005: Boża podszewka II as Maryśka Jurewicz-Lulewicz
 2006: Statyści as Bożena Popławska-Ochman
 2006: Fundacja as Kazia
 2006: S@motność w sieci as Iwona, a friend of Ewa
 2006: Co słonko widziało as brunette
 2007: Ogród Luizy as Anna Świątek
 2007: Regina as Anna Raj, Regina's sister (TV)
 2008: Cztery noce z Anną as Anna P.
 2008: Jeszcze raz as Grażyna
 2008: Rysa as Zosia
 2008: Louise's Garden 
 2008−2020: Ojciec Mateusz as Natalia (TV)
 2009: Dom zły as Bożena Dziabasowa
 2009: Idealny facet dla mojej dziewczyny as Plesicowa
 2010: Milion dolarów as Bożenka
 2010: Joanna as Staszka Kopeć
 2010: Nie ten człowiek as a client in aquarium shop
 2011: Róża as Amelia
 2011: Sala samobójców as psychiatrist Karolina
 2011: W ciemności as Wanda Socha
 2011: Instynkt as Karlikowa (TV, episode 9)
 2012: Ja to mam szczęście as Joanna (TV)
 2014: The Mighty Angel
 2015: The Lure
 2016: WszystkoGra as Roma
 2018: Pułapka as Natalia Różańska (TV)
 2019: Stulecie Winnych as Bronislawa (TV)

References

External links

 

1971 births
20th-century Polish actresses
21st-century Polish actresses
Polish stage actresses
Actors from Wrocław
Polish people of Austrian descent
Living people
Polish film actresses
Polish television actresses
Recipients of the Silver Medal for Merit to Culture – Gloria Artis
Recipients of the Bronze Medal for Merit to Culture – Gloria Artis
Recipient of the Meritorious Activist of Culture badge